Firas (also Feras) may refer to:

 Firas or Feras, as Arabic given name. 
 Firas Tlass (born 1960), Syrian businessman
 Abu Firas al-Hamdani (932–968), an Arab prince and poet
 Princess Dana Firas (born 1970), Jordanian princess
 FIRAS (Far-InfraRed Absolute Spectrophotometer), an astronomical instrument aboard Cosmic Background Explorer

See also
 Feras, a given name